Companhia Aeronáutica Paulista usually known as CAP was a Brazilian aircraft manufacturer established in São Paulo.

History
It acquired the assets of Empresa Aeronáutica Ypiranga the same year it was founded and with them, the design that was to become its most important product, the CAP-4. Despite strong sales of this aircraft (nearly 800 were built), the company ran into financial problems in 1948 and was forced to close. The remaining assets were nationalized, with some eventually being taken over by Neiva.

Aircraft

References

Defunct aircraft manufacturers of Brazil
Manufacturing companies based in São Paulo